Cinta dan Anugerah (Love and Blessing)  is an Indonesian TV serial that was aired on RCTI. It was produced video productions house public distributor company network by SinemArt directed by Sanjeev Kumar.

Cast
 Nabila Syakieb as Nabila/Yasmin
 Ashraf Sinclair as Reza
 Miller as Avian/Tengku Jamal
 Eva Anindhita as Chintya
 Yasmine Leeds Wildblood as Aira
 Giovanni Yosafat Tobing as Gio
 Richard Kevin as Alvino
 Wilda Hamid as Mini
 Raya Kohandi as Zaskia
 Ibnu Jamil as Bima
 Cut Sarah as Saira
 Vonny Cornellya Permatasari as Harris
 Asha Shara as Hani
 Adipura as Harris
 Teuku Mirza as Krisna
 Marcell Darwin as Aldi
 Luna Maya as Luna
 Tri Ningtyas as Faridah
 Keith Foo as Rama
 Adjie Pangestu as Raffi
 Amanda William as Amanda
 Dirly as Bayu 
 Donny Damara as Imran
 Hanna Hasyim as Halimah
 Anna Tarigan as Sara
 Kevin Julio as Soni

Synopsis
Nabila (Nabila Syakieb), a simple, kind, and beautiful girl, lives with her two sisters, Aira (Yasmine Wildblood) and Mini (Wilda Hamid). Despite the strong contrast in character, three of them always get along. Life hasn't been easy for them. They have to lose their only valuables, their house, to pay up their late father's debt. Their father only left them with a note saying that they have a relative named Reza (Ashraf Sinclair), a rich businessman. Their arrival was not well received by Reza. But after reading the note, a cold and handsome Reza accepted them into his house under one condition. They have to work.
Reza's sister, Saira (Cut Sarra), who also lives there with her children, Chintya (Eva Anindita), Ryan (Giovani L. Tobing) and Soni (Kevin Julio) were not too happy with Nabilla's arrival. Especially once they found out that Avian (Miller), Reeza's right hand man, was falling for Aira. Not only did Avian fell for Aira, but also so did Reza. Not knowing that in fact, Nabilla was secretly in love with Reza. But Nabilla can never break her sister's heart. How will her life turn out? Will she ever conquer Reza's heart?

External links
 Cinta dan Anugerah

Indonesian television series